Lorraine Rothman (January 12, 1932 – September 25, 2007) was an American activist. She was a founding member of the feminist self-help clinic movement. In 1971, she invented the Del-Em menstrual extraction kit to make available abortions to women before Roe v. Wade. She was an advocate of self-induced abortions.

Early life 
Lorraine Rothman was born Evelyn Lorraine Fleishman in San Francisco, California in 1932 into a traditional Orthodox Jewish family and attended Hebrew school during her younger years. While working full-time, she attended Los Angeles City College and California State University Los Angeles, where she received a B.A. and teaching credential in 1954. After marrying in 1954, she moved to Baltimore with her husband, Al Rothman, and taught in the Baltimore City Public School System. She returned to California with her husband and children in 1964 and resumed public school teaching.

Social activism 
In 1968, Rothman first joined a local women's liberation group that met at California State University Fullerton, and then became a founding member of the Orange County chapter of NOW. Rothman's collaborative relationship with Carol Downer and the Self-Help Clinic movement began when she attended a meeting in 1971 organized by Downer to discuss women's reproductive rights and abortion. In the weeks before the meeting, Downer and a few other women visited Harvey Karman's illegal abortion clinic on Santa Monica Boulevard in West Los Angeles to learn how Karman performed abortions. Rothman volunteered to adapt Karman's manual vacuum aspiration equipment for home use. A week after her first meeting with Downer, she demonstrated the prototype of the Del-Em menstrual extraction kit for their group. The Del-Em kit was created to allow women to perform self-examinations and early abortions without having to visit a doctor, since at the time of its creation abortions were not legal. In 1972, Downer and Rothman founded the first Feminist Women's Health Center (FWHC) in Los Angeles. Later on, she co-founded the second FWHC in Santa Ana, California. At the FWHC in Los Angeles, the main priority was increasing women's awareness of their bodies and allowing for there to be a sense of security. Cervical and vaginal self-exams were demonstrated at the clinic so that women could perform these at home and not have to worry about going to a doctors office and needing mandatory approval otherwise. On top of cervical and vaginal self-exams, the demonstration of the at-home pregnancy tests was introduced. Rothman's main priority was to allow for there to be sense of establishment within the patients as well as letting the patients know that there was 100% integrity within these programs. Along with the tests that were taught at the clinic, there was an outreach for a patient advocacy program. Through this patient advocacy program, patients could receive outpatient suction abortions. Approximately 60% of all surgical interventions are done in outpatient settings.

Many women during this time were not only fighting for their equality, but to have a voice, so these important advances served them greatly. Rothman was admired significantly for her work, and there are several memorials honoring her legacy.

Over the next two decades, Rothman traveled widely, taking the Self-Help Clinic concept to women's groups both in and outside the United States. In addition to working as an administrator, Rothman wrote health education guides for the FWHCs. In 1999, Rothman co-authored a book with Marcia Wexler called "Menopause Myths and Facts: What Every Woman Should Know About Hormone Replacement Therapy," which was critical of hormone replacement therapy. Of HRT she has said, "Hormone Replacement Therapy is a misnomer: they are not hormones (they are drugs made synthetically in the laboratory), they are not replacing anything (our bodies continue to make enough hormones during and after menopause), and they are not therapeutic (menopause is not a disease)."

Death 
Rothman died of bladder cancer on September 25, 2007, in Fullerton, California.

Legacy 
According to the book titled Into Our Own Hands, "Lorraine Rothman developed a menstrual extraction kit that she called the Del-Em, which gave women unprecedented control over their monthly periods." Rothman was concerned about more females learning about their bodies. By providing them with this knowledge, she wanted to make sure women were aware and educated about the control they have over their own bodies. In light of Rothman's opening of the "Los Angeles Feminist Women's Health Center" women all over the world were intrigued by their bodies and self-worth.

Further reading
"Women's History: Feminist Health Movement" The Virtual Oral Aural History Archive 
 Menopause Myths and Facts: What Every Woman Should Know About Hormone Replacement Therapy. Lorraine Rothman and Marcia Wexler. Feminist Health Press, 1999. 
 "Body Politic: The Growth of the Women's Health Movement," Barbara Ehrenreich, Ms. Magazine 1984 
 A New View of a Woman's Body, Feminist Press, 1991  (Lorraine Rothman contributing editor)
 
 "Evelyn Lorraine Rothman (1932-2007) The Embryo Project Encyclopedia
 "Lorraine Rothman" Women's Health Specialists

References

1932 births
2007 deaths
American abortion-rights activists
American women's rights activists
Deaths from cancer in California
Deaths from bladder cancer
Los Angeles City College alumni
California State University, Los Angeles alumni
American inventors
Women inventors
Women's health movement